

Lake Amtkeli or Amtkel is a lake in the Gulripshi District of Abkhazia, Georgia that was formed on 3 October 1891 when an earthquake caused a landslide on the south-western slope of Mt. little Shkhapach into the valley of the Amtkeli River.

Geography
Lake Amtkeli is fed by the Amtkeli River, but only a small part of its water percolates through the obstructing rubble back into the river. The greater part leaves the lake through underground passages to the Jampal River.

Due to the lake's origin, its underwater slopes are steep, following the surface slopes.

Environment
Lake Amtkeli is home to trout, chub, nase, barbel and spirlin.

Human settlement
The village of Azanta is located next to lake Amtkeli, and some of its inhabitants keep fishing boats on its shore.

References

Lakes of Abkhazia
Mountain lakes